Martin Clifford Lloyd Williams (born 12 May 1965) is the first (and current) Archdeacon of Brighton and Lewes in the Church of England's Diocese of Chichester: he was licensed on 1 March 2015.

Lloyd Williams was educated at Westminster College and Trinity College, Bristol. He was ordained in 1994  and spent many years in Bath (Curate, St Andrew; Rector, St Michael; Rural Dean) before his appointment as Archdeacon.

References

1965 births
Alumni of Trinity College, Bristol
Archdeacons of Lewes
Living people